

Pre season friendlies

Super League

Huddersfield Giants seasons